The narrow-billed woodcreeper (Lepidocolaptes angustirostris) is a species of bird in the Dendrocolaptinae subfamily. It is found in Argentina, Bolivia, Brazil, Paraguay, Suriname, and Uruguay. Its natural habitats are subtropical or tropical dry forests and dry savanna. As all members of its subfamily, it is a creeping bird which lives on small arthropods and vertebrates it catches under the bark of trees. The woodcreeper nests in cavities, both natural and bird-(e.g. woodpecker)made. It lays two to three white eggs, brooded jointly by the pair.

References

narrow-billed woodcreeper
Birds of Argentina
Birds of Bolivia
Birds of Brazil
Birds of Paraguay
Birds of Uruguay
narrow-billed woodcreeper
Taxa named by Louis Jean Pierre Vieillot
Birds of the Amazon Basin
Taxonomy articles created by Polbot